This is a list of listed buildings in the Stirling council area. The list is split out by parish.

 List of listed buildings in Aberfoyle, Stirling
 List of listed buildings in Balfron, Stirling
 List of listed buildings in Balquhidder, Stirling
 List of listed buildings in Bridge Of Allan, Stirling
 List of listed buildings in Buchanan, Stirling
 List of listed buildings in Callander, Stirling
 List of listed buildings in Comrie, Stirling
 List of listed buildings in Doune, Stirling
 List of listed buildings in Drymen, Stirling
 List of listed buildings in Dunblane And Lecropt, Stirling
 List of listed buildings in Dunblane, Stirling
 List of listed buildings in Fintry, Stirling
 List of listed buildings in Gargunnock, Stirling
 List of listed buildings in Killearn, Stirling
 List of listed buildings in Killin, Stirling
 List of listed buildings in Kilmadock, Stirling
 List of listed buildings in Kilmaronock, Stirling
 List of listed buildings in Kincardine-In-Menteith, Stirling
 List of listed buildings in Kippen, Stirling
 List of listed buildings in Logie, Stirling
 List of listed buildings in Port Of Menteith, Stirling
 List of listed buildings in St Ninians, Stirling
 List of listed buildings in Stirling, Stirling
 List of listed buildings in Strathblane, Stirling

Stirling (council area)